Martin Brachall Bailey (January 22, 1857 – July 27, 1934) was an American politician and lawyer.

Biography
Bailey was born in Indianola, Illinois and went to the public schools. He went to Illinois State University, Earlham College, and Columbia Law School. Bailey was admitted to the Illinois bar and practices law in Danville, Illinois. He served as mayor of Danville and was a Republican. Bailey served in the Illinois House of Representatives from 1895 to 1899. He then served in the Illinois Senate from 1901 to 1905 and from 1909 to 1934. Bailey died at his home in Danville, Illinois.

References

External links

1857 births
1934 deaths
People from Danville, Illinois
Earlham College alumni
Columbia Law School alumni
Illinois State University alumni
Illinois lawyers
Mayors of places in Illinois
Republican Party members of the Illinois House of Representatives
Republican Party Illinois state senators